In Inuit mythology, Aulanerk is a friendly sea god who rules over the tides, waves and joy. He is said to be naked and living in the sea.

References

Inuit gods
Sea and river gods